Eva Pavlović Mori (born 13 March 1996) is a Slovenian female volleyball player, playing as a setter. She is part of the Slovenia women's national volleyball team. 

With Slovenia, she competed at the 2015 Women's European Volleyball Championship. On club level she played for Calcit Volley, Volley Bergamo, Béziers Volley, Volero Le Cannet, ŁKS Łódź, Ilbank, Vandœuvre Nancy, and PTT Spor.

References

1996 births
Living people
Slovenian women's volleyball players
Slovenian expatriate sportspeople in Italy
Expatriate volleyball players in Italy
Slovenian expatriate sportspeople in France
Expatriate volleyball players in France
Slovenian expatriate sportspeople in Poland
Expatriate volleyball players in Poland
Slovenian expatriate sportspeople in Turkey
Expatriate volleyball players in Turkey